Thaniyavarthanam is a 1987 Malayalam drama film written by A. K. Lohithadas and directed by Sibi Malayil. It stars Mammootty as school teacher Balagopalan, Thilakan as the uncle of the matrilineal family, Mukesh as Gopinathan, and Kaviyoor Ponnamma. Upon release it became cult classic. Thilakan won Kerala State Film Award for Second Best Actor.

Upon release, it received critical acclaim. The film discusses a variety of topics such as superstition and orthodoxy in rural Kerala, attitudes towards mental illness, the difference of attitudes between people of different generations, and the decline of once-proud Nair "joint families". It was actor Thilakan who recommended Mammootty for the lead role (Balagopalan). The screenplay by Lohithadas stands out even today because of its scientific accuracy and realistic depiction.

Plot
The story is set in a rural village in Kerala. Balagopalan Master or Balan Master, a school drawing teacher in Government service, has a serene life, with two children, a wife, a mother, a younger brother - Gopi and a younger sister. Gopi is an educated young man, who is against all superstitions. Balagopalan is part of a declining, yet proud, Nair joint family in the village. The elder members of the family are rooted in superstition and orthodoxy. It is a traditional matrilineal society the karnavar the elder one in the family takes decisions and power , here instead of the father, the uncle ( elder one)  enjoys more power. All decisions in the family are taken by him.

Balan has another uncle, Sreedharan, who is locked up and chained in a dark room in the house as he is considered to be mentally challenged. The belief among the family is that one male from each generation will go mad as a person from their previous generation had sinned by throwing the idol of the family goddess in a well. He was cursed by the goddess and became a lunatic. This curse is supposed to pass down through generations. Balan's uncle finally dies and the talk of the village became - "Who would be next - Balan or Gopi ?"

One night changes it all when Balan has a terrible nightmare. The whole house is woken up in the middle of the night. The elder members of the family suspect that Balan is turning mad. The news somehow gets out. Villagers start suspecting Balan of following the footsteps of his ancestors into madness as Sreedharan too had fallen mentally ill with a nightmare.

Now the village evaluates and judges each and every move he makes; he is soon deemed mentally ill. His actions are misinterpreted. His students consider him to be a lunatic. He applies for an extended leave and transfers from service. Even some members of his family suspect that he has gone mad. The situation affects Balan and turns him confused. Gopi, progressive and educated, consult Balan with a medically qualified physician. The physician declares him sane. But the village doesn't agree.

In the meantime, Balan's wife is forced to leave the house with their children. The family fixes the marriage of his younger sister while hiding the fact she has a "challenged" elder brother. Eventually, Balan is admitted to an asylum and undergoes treatment. He is released after a few days - both mentally and physically broken - and confines to the darkroom his uncle once lived in. Society hounds him and beats him into mental subjugation. 

Balan's mother eventually poisons him and kills him on the day of the ritual for forgiveness from the goddess - to free him from the world. The same hands which had fed him his first morsel of rice became the ones that fed him his last meal. She too kills herself, as she couldn't forgive herself for this heinous act.

Cast
Mammootty as Balagopalan or Balan Master, a drawing teacher
Saritha as Indu, Balan's wife
Asha Jayaram as Sumitra
Parvathy
Mukesh as Gopinathan - younger brother of Balagopalan - progressive in mindset
Thilakan as Balan's Uncle
Kaviyoor Ponnamma as Balan's Mother
Philomina as Balan's Grandmother
Innocent as Headmaster of the school
Babu Namboothiri as Sreedharan - Balan's 'mad' uncle
Sonia as Anitha M. Balagopalan (Manikutty)
Valsala Menon as Balan's Aunt
Prathapachandran as Balan's Father-in-Law
Oduvil Unnikrishnan as Raman Karthavu
Bobby Kottarakkara as Narayanan

Themes
The movie deals with certain psychological themes and the toxic nature of society in the olden days. Balagopalan had lived a stress-free life. But due to superstitions and overall lack of knowledge of mental health in those times, his life was ruined. The scrutiny of society coupled with the traditional mindset of the people back then led to Balagopalan's downfall. In the nightmare, Balagopalan hears the rattle of the chain in his dream which symbolizes the fact he's chained to traditions and he is a hostage to these traditions. The same chains which had chained his uncle and eventually led to his demise.

Soundtrack
The music was composed by M. G. Radhakrishnan.

Awards
Filmfare Award for Best  Film - Malayalam won by V. Nandakumar (1987)

Legacy
Thaniyavathanam is considered to be one of the best Indian films on mental health. Upon release it was met with excellent reviews from critics. Director Ram cited Thaniyavarthanam as his reason for casting Mammootty as the lead in Peranbu. The film was a major commercial success which was uncommon for films dealing with sensitive topics like mental illness. The film is still highly regarded today and has achieved cult status. One of Kamal Hassan's favorite 70 Indian movies is Thaniyavarthanam.

See also 

 Mental illness in film
 List of films featuring mental illness

References

External links 

1987 films
1987 drama films
1980s Malayalam-language films
Films about mental health
Films shot in Thrissur
Films directed by Sibi Malayil
Films scored by M. G. Radhakrishnan
Films with screenplays by A. K. Lohithadas
Indian drama films